Filifusus filamentosus is a species of sea snail, a marine gastropod mollusk in the family Fasciolariidae, the spindle snails, the tulip snails and their allies.

Distribution
This species occurs in the Red Sea and in the Indian Ocean off Tanzania, Madagascar and the Mascarene Basin

References

 Lamarck, J. B. de. 1816. Tableau encyclopédique et méthodique des trois règnes de la Nature. Paris
 Dautzenberg, Ph. (1929). Contribution à l'étude de la faune de Madagascar: Mollusca marina testacea. Faune des colonies françaises, III(fasc. 4). Société d'Editions géographiques, maritimes et coloniales: Paris. 321–636, plates IV-VII pp.
 Drivas, J. & M. Jay (1988). Coquillages de La Réunion et de l'île Maurice
 Marais J.P. & R.N. Kilburn (2010) Fasciolariidae. pp. 106–137, in: Marais A.P. & Seccombe A.D. (eds), Identification guide to the seashells of South Africa. Volume 1. Groenkloof: Centre for Molluscan Studies. 376 pp.
 Snyder M.A., Vermeij G.J. & Lyons W.G. (2012) The genera and biogeography of Fasciolariinae (Gastropoda, Neogastropoda, Fasciolariidae). Basteria 76(1–3): 31–70.

Fasciolariidae
Gastropods described in 1798